Hexestrol, sold under the brand name Synestrol among others, is a nonsteroidal estrogen which was previously used for estrogen replacement therapy and in the treatment of certain hormone-dependent cancers as well as gynecological disorders but is mostly no longer marketed. It has also been used in the form of esters such as hexestrol diacetate (brand name Sintestrol) and hexestrol dipropionate (brand name Hexanoestrol). Hexestrol and its esters are taken by mouth, held under the tongue, or via injection into muscle.

Medical uses
Hexestrol has been used in estrogen replacement therapy, for the treatment of breast cancer in women and prostate cancer in men, and for the treatment of certain gynecological disorders.

Pharmacology

Pharmacodynamics
Hexestrol has approximately 302% and 234% of the affinity of estradiol for the estrogen receptors (ERs) ERα and ERβ, respectively. The affinity of hexestrol for the ERs is said to be similar to or slightly higher than that of estradiol. Along with diethylstilbestrol, hexestrol has been said to be one of the most potent estrogens known. The total endometrial proliferation dose per cycle of different forms of hexestrol are 70 to 100 mg for oral hexestrol, 45 mg for sublingual hexestrol diacetate, and 25 mg for hexestrol dipropionate by intramuscular injection. These doses are fairly similar to those of estradiol and its esters. Hexestrol induces mammary gland development in rodents similarly to other estrogens.

Nonsteroidal estrogens like diethylstilbestrol, which is closely related structurally to hexestrol, are known to have dramatically disproportionate estrogenic effects in the liver and on liver protein synthesis.

Pharmacokinetics

The pharmacokinetics and distribution of hexestrol have been studied with intravenous injection of aqueous solution in women and with subcutaneous injection of oil solution in female goats and sheep.

Chemistry

Hexestrol, also known as dihydrodiethylstilbestrol, is a synthetic nonsteroidal estrogen of the stilbestrol group related to diethylstilbestrol. Esters of hexestrol include hexestrol diacetate, hexestrol dicaprylate, hexestrol diphosphate, and hexestrol dipropionate.

History
Hexestrol was first described by Campbell, Dodds, and Lawson in 1938. It was isolated from the demethylation products of anethole.

Society and culture

Generic names
Hexestrol is the generic name of the drug and its .

Brand names
Hexestrol has been marketed under a variety of brand names including Synestrol, Synoestrol, Estrifar, and Estronal, among others.

Availability
Hexestrol has mostly been discontinued and remains available in only a handful of countries. Esters of hexestrol which have been marketed include hexestrol diacetate, hexestrol dicaprylate, hexestrol diphosphate, and hexestrol dipropionate.

References

Abandoned drugs
Phenols
Stilbenoids
Synthetic estrogens